Neuronal membrane glycoprotein M6-a is a protein that in humans is encoded by the GPM6A gene.

References

Further reading